Leah Cherniak (born 1956) is a Canadian playwright, actor, and teacher. She is a co-founder of Theatre Columbus (now called Common Boots).

Early life and education 
Cherniak graduated from the University of Toronto with a BA in 1979. She later studied at École Jacques Lecoq, where she met Martha Ross.

Career 
Cherniak co-founded Theatre Columbus with Martha Ross in 1984. Originally, the company was called The Gargoils. In 2015, Theatre Columbus changed their name to Common Boots Theatre.

Teaching 
Beginning in 1985, Cherniak taught clown at the National Theatre School. In 2001, Cherniak began teaching dance at Ryerson University (now Toronto Metropolitan University) and George Brown College.

Directorial credits

Theatre 

 Up Against the Wallpaper  Nightwood Theatre (1989)
 The Tell-Tale Heart  Theatre Columbus (1995)
 Froth (1996)
 Three Birds Alighting on a Field  George Brown Theatre (2000)
 Lonely Nights and Other Stories   Theatre Columbus, co-directed with Maggie Huculak (2001)
 Rue Alridge  Tarragon Theatre (2004)
 Edward the “Crazy Man”  Lorraine Kimsa Theatre for Young People (2008)
 6 Essential Questions  Factory Theatre (2014)
 Clown  Ryerson School of Performance (2018)
 The Ward Cabaret  Harbourfront Centre Theatre (2020), co-directed with David Buchbinder
 Perpetual Archaeology  Crow's Theatre written by and starring Alex Bulmer (June 2023)

Film 

 Things Dead People Say  short film (2020)

Acting credits

Theatre

Plays 

 Until We Part  co-written with Martha Ross
 The Anger in Ernest and Ernestine  co-written with Robert Morgan and Martha Ross
Still Clowning  co-written with Martha Ross
 The Fragments  co-written with Suvendrini Lena and Trevor Schwellnus
 The Theory of Relatives  co-written with Daniel Brooks, Diane Flacks, Richard Greenblatt, Leslie Lester, and Allan Merovitz
 The Attic, The Pearls, and Three Fine Girls  co-written with Jennifer Brewin, Martha Ross, Ann-Marie MacDonald, and Alisa Palmer
 More Fine Girls  co-written with Brewin, Ross, MacDonald, and Palmer, sequel to The Attic, The Pearls, and Three Fine Girls
 Scadding  co-created with Jennifer Brewin, Alex Bulmer, Khadijah Roberts-Abdullah, John Gzowski, Maggie Huculak, Anand Rajaram, Jenny Salisbury and Stephon Smith
 The Betrayal  co-written with Oliver Dennis, Maggie Huculak, Robert Morgan, Martha Ross and Michael Simpson

Awards

References 

Living people
University of Toronto alumni
Academic staff of Toronto Metropolitan University
Academic staff of the National Theatre School of Canada
Academic staff of George Brown College
L'École Internationale de Théâtre Jacques Lecoq alumni
20th-century Canadian dramatists and playwrights
21st-century Canadian dramatists and playwrights
Canadian women dramatists and playwrights
1956 births
Canadian theatre directors
Women theatre directors
Dora Mavor Moore Award winners
20th-century Canadian women writers
21st-century Canadian women writers